Thomas Staughton Savage (June 7, 1804 in Cromwell, Connecticut – December 27, 1880 in Rhinebeck, New York) was an American Protestant clergyman, missionary, physician, and naturalist.

He attended Yale College and Yale Medical School. His first marriage was to Susan A. Metcalfe September 28, 1838. He married his second wife, Maria Chapin, in 1842. It was after her death that he married Elizabeth Rutherford, granddaughter of the author Eliza Fenwick, in 1844. He was the father of five children, Elizabeth Fenwick Savage (b. 1846), Alexander Duncan Savage (b. 1848), Thomas Rutherford Savage (b. 1852), William Rutherford Savage (b. 1854), Jesse Duncan Savage (b. 1858). He was the grandfather of the American artist Thomas Casilear Cole (1888-1976).

In 1836 Savage was sent as a missionary to Liberia. During his time in Africa he acquired the skull and bones from an unknown ape species, which he described in 1847 at the Boston Society of Natural History with American  naturalist and anatomist Jeffries Wyman with the scientific name Troglodytes gorilla, now known as the western gorilla.

References

External links
    Episcopal Church History
 

1804 births
1880 deaths
American Protestant missionaries
American zoologists
Yale School of Medicine alumni
People from Cromwell, Connecticut